The Palestinian Liberation Front (PLF) is a Palestinian political faction. Since 1997, the PLF has been a designated terrorist organization by the United States and by Canada since 2003. The PLF has also been banned in Japan.

Terrorist activities

Achille Lauro hijacking 

One notorious incident was the hijacking of the Italian cruise ship MS Achille Lauro on 7 October 1985. The hijackers' original aim was to use the ship to slip into Israel. However, crew members discovered them cleaning weapons, and the group then seized control of the ship, murdering an elderly wheelchair-dependent Jewish New Yorker, Leon Klinghoffer.

US fighter planes later forced down the Egyptian aircraft in which Abbas was escaping following a negotiated end of the hijacking, and forced it to land at a USAF base on Sigonella, Sicily. The Italians let Abbas go, but subsequently sentenced him to five life sentences in absentia. Abbas was expelled from Tunisia and established his headquarters in Baghdad, Iraq.

The United States could have brought its own charges against Abbas, although a criminal complaint filed against him in 1986 was dropped a short time later without an indictment.

1990 beach raid 
In May 1990, the PLF launched an attack on Israel's Nizanim beach, near Tel Aviv, urged on by Iraq to torpedo the moves towards a negotiated solution between the PLO and Israel. The attackers had intended to kill tourists and Israeli civilians, but this was prevented. However, the action was significant, in that the failure of Yasser Arafat to condemn this attack led to the United States backing out of the American–Palestinian dialogue that had begun in 1988. Despite Arafat's official silence on the issue, the PLF suffered heavy internal criticism within the PLO, and Abu Abbas had to step down from his seat on the executive committee.

PLF in recent years
PLF leaders were active in the PLO with Abu Abbas acting as PLF representative in the PLO's executive committee. During the years after the PLO signed the 1993 Oslo Accords, which the PLF opposes, Abu Abbas agreed to abandon terrorism and acknowledged Israel's right to exist. The movement maintained offices in the Palestinian Territories, Lebanon and Iraq, but its activities dwindled. It has a low level of support in the West Bank and Gaza Strip, and its main strength lies in the Lebanese refugee camps, where it is reported to have coordinated with Fatah against various Syrian-backed factions.

In November 2001, 15 members of a PLF cell were arrested by Israeli authorities. Some of those captured had received military training in Iraq. The cell had been planning attacks in Jerusalem, Tel Aviv, and Ben Gurion airport. The cell had already been involved in other terrorist activities including the murder of Israeli civilian Yuri Gushstein.

During the US-led Operation Iraqi Freedom, Abu Abbas was captured in April 2003 by US forces. He died on 9 March 2004 while in US custody in Iraq, reportedly of natural causes.

See also
1979 Nahariya attack
Palestinian Liberation Front (Abu Nidal Ashqar wing)
Palestinian Liberation Front (Abd ul-Fattah Ghanim wing)

References

Political parties established in 1961
Arab nationalism in the Palestinian territories
Arab nationalist militant groups
Arab Nationalist Movement breakaway groups
Arab nationalist political parties
Factions in the Lebanese Civil War
Factions of the Palestine Liberation Organization
Organisations designated as terrorist by Japan
Organizations designated as terrorist by the United States
Organizations based in Asia designated as terrorist
Palestinian militant groups
Palestinian nationalist parties
Socialist parties in the Palestinian territories
Organizations designated as terrorist by Canada